Boss Life is the fourth studio album by American rapper Slim Thug. The album was released on November 19, 2013. The album features guest appearances from Big Sant, Big K.R.I.T., Paul Wall, Chamillionaire, Kirko Bangz, Z-Ro, BeatKing, Boston George, Bun B, Yo Gotti, Kevin Gates, Muggs, JustBrittany, Lil Keke and Nipsey Hussle.

Singles
On August 20, 2013, the album's first single "Coming Down (Every Town)" featuring Kirko Bangz, Big K.R.I.T. & Z-Ro was released. On August 29, 2013, the album's second single "Flex 4Eva" featuring Beat King and Boston George was released. On January 29, 2014, the music video was released for "Flex 4Eva" featuring Beat King and Boston George.

Track listing

Charts

References

Slim Thug albums
2013 albums
Albums produced by Big K.R.I.T.